Brodnica Castle is a well fortified castle in Brodnica, Poland.

Description

The castle is built in a square formation. The four wings of the castle surrounded the central courtyard.  A 54-metre tower provided an entrance to the second floor of the castle. In the corners of the castle were small look-out towers, which stick out from the castle's square shape. The castle basements were used as utility rooms. The underground rooms performed various functions: a chapel, refectory, chapter house, infirmary, chamber of the commander and other specialised rooms. Entries to them lead to the gallery surrounding the courtyard. The second floor included from the side of the courtyard magazines and a granary, and an additional defensive porch within castle walls. By the main tower there is a gate to which access was provided by a former drawbridge. It was a key part of the castle's defense complex. The pre-castle fortification was placed between the town and the castle.

History

The building of the Teutonic castle in Brodnica began in the fourteenth century, taking almost a whole century to complete. In 1466, the castle complex became part of the Kingdom of Poland. After a fire in 1550, the rebuilding of the castle was done so by the Starosta Rafał Działyński. During the Swedish-Polish Wars the castle began to turn into ruins. In 1785, King Frederick II of Prussia ordered do dismantle the ruins, but his orders were soon stopped by Frederick Wilhelm IV. The fate of the palace of Anna Wazówna was sealed by a fire in 1945.

The palace was restored in the 1960s. Currently, the castle houses a museum, and the palace a library.

See also 
 Castles in Poland

References

Castles in Kuyavian-Pomeranian Voivodeship
Brodnica County
14th-century architecture